Kathleen Bruce (21 October 1885 – 26 April 1950) was an American historian.

Life and work
Kathleen Eveleth Bruce was born in Richmond, Virginia on 21 October 1885. She attended Radcliffe College and received all three of her post-secondary degree from that institution; A.B. in 1918, A.M. in 1919 and Ph.D. in 1924. Bruce taught history and government at Wheaton College from 1924 to 1926 and then was a faculty member at the College of William & Mary in 1926–28. She received a grant from the National Research Council for 1928–29 and researched the social, cultural, and business lives of the planters in the South before the American Civil War. From 1930 to 1932 Bruce researched at the Museum of Science and Industry, in Chicago, Illinois, for the McCormick Biographical Association. In 1932–33 she worked for the Nettie Fowler McCormick Foundation. Bruce was a contributor to the Dictionary of American Biography and in 1931 wrote Virginia Iron Manufacture in the Slave Era and 'Massachusetts Women of the Revolution (1716–1789)', a chapter in The Commonwealth of Massachusetts Colony, Province and State. She resumed teaching at Hollins College in Roanoke, Virginia in 1933, but served as the state supervisor of federal archives and records in Virginia while researching the agricultural records of Berry Hill Plantation in Halifax County, Virginia. From 1943 to 1946 she was assistant professor of history at Sophie Newcomb College in New Orleans, Louisiana. She returned to Richmond in 1946 and became
professor of history at Westhampton College of the University of Richmond. Bruce became chronically ill in January 1949 and died on 26 April 1950.

References

1885 births
1950 deaths
Radcliffe College alumni
20th-century American historians
Wheaton College faculty
People from Richmond, Virginia
Historians from Virginia